Places is the second studio album by American singer Lea Michele. It was released on April 28, 2017, by Columbia Records. The album was preceded by the lead single, "Love Is Alive".

Places received mixed reviews from critics, though Michele's vocal performance received a positive reception. In the United States, the album sold over 16,000 copies in its first week, debuting at number 28 on the Billboard 200 albums chart. In the United Kingdom, the album debuted at number 37 on the UK Albums Chart. In Canada, the album reached number 21 in its first week of release. As well as the first single "Love Is Alive", three promotional singles were also released in the lead up to the album. Songwriters who feature on the album include singers Ellie Goulding, Linda Perry, Allie X, and Alexandra Savior.

Background
Recording for Michele's second studio album began in April 2015. Shortly into the recording process, Michele stated that the album would be less pop-influenced than her debut, and would "[go] back to [her] roots" with a more theatrical sound.

On January 11, 2017, Michele announced on social media that she would go on a mini tour in later that same month to promote her second album. She wrote, "My incredible fans have always been there for me. You inspire me. You've stood by me, cheered me on and lifted me up. When preparing for [this] upcoming album I wanted you all to know how important you are to me. These shows are a sneak peek into my upcoming album, as well as songs from Louder and maybe.. even a little Glee." An Intimate Evening with Lea Michele consisted of three shows in Los Angeles, New York and Santa Monica, which began on January 23 at the Hotel Café, and ended on January 30 at the Broad Stage. On January 26, 2017, while Michele was in the middle of her mini tour, it was announced the second album would be titled Places. The title references the showtime call of "places" when working in live theater.

Singles
"Love Is Alive" was released as the album's lead single on March 3, 2017.

Commercial performance
In the United States, the album debuted at number 28 on the Billboard 200 with over 16,000 copies sold in its first week.

Track listing

Personnel
Adapted from AllMusic.

Performers
 Lea Michele – lead vocals, backing vocals
 Alexandra Tamposi – backing vocals
 John Shanks – backing vocals
 Kyle Moorman – backing vocals

Design and management
 Amanda Berman – A&R
 Alexandra Tamposi – A&R
 Shari Sutchliffe – production coordination, contracting
 Maria P. Marulanda – art direction, design
 Lea Michele – art direction, design
 Eric Ray Davidson – photographer

Technical

 John Shanks – keyboards, piano, electric guitar, bass, programming, engineering, producer
 Xandy Barry – keyboards, guitar, drums, orchestral arranging, mixing, programming, engineering, producer
 John Levine – keyboards, piano, bass, drum programming, engineering, producer
 Kyle Moorman – guitar, percussion, digital editing, programming, engineering, producer
 Jesse Shatkin – piano, bass, drums, synthesizer, programming, engineering, producer
 Andrew Hollander – piano, drums, Mellotron, engineering, mixing, producer
 Jamie Muhoberac – keyboards, piano, programming
 Toby Gad – instrumentation, arranging, producer
 Alexandra Tamposi – vocal producer, vocal percussion
 Suzy Shinn – vocal engineering
 Joe LaPorta – mastering
 Joe Zook – mixing
 Michael H. Brauer – mixing
 Manny Marroquin – mixing
 Chris Galland – mixing engineering
 Steve Vealey – mixing assistant
 Paul Lamalfa – engineering, digital editing
 Sam Dent – engineering
 Taylor Crommie – assistant engineering
 Seth Olansky – assistant engineering
 Chantal Kreviazuk – piano
 Linda Perry – piano
 Jon Sosin – guitar
 Aaron Sterling – drums
 Simon Huber – cello
 Robin Florentine – assistant
 Jeff Jackson – assistant

Charts

References

External links
 

2017 albums
Albums produced by John Shanks
Albums produced by Toby Gad
Columbia Records albums
Lea Michele albums